Hünerberg is a hill in Hesse, Germany.

In the era of Julius Caesar and Augustus it was part of the territory of the Batavi. Drusus built a fort there shortly before his German campaign.

References

Hills of Hesse
Mountains and hills of the Taunus